Alston Davidson "Aus" Watts (1867–1927) was a North Carolina politician. A Democrat, Watts represented Iredell County, North Carolina in the North Carolina House of Representatives (1901 and 1903) and in the North Carolina Senate.

In 1912, Watts did not support Woodrow Wilson for the Democratic nomination for President, but Wilson appointed him as a federal revenue collector for western North Carolina in 1913, at the behest of Sen. Lee S. Overman.

His most important role, arguably, was as "chief lieutenant" to U.S. Senator Furnifold Simmons, whose powerful political machine dominated North Carolina politics in the early 20th century, according to the journalist Rob Christensen.

Watts was instrumental in helping Cameron Morrison win the Democratic primary for Governor in 1920, using race-baiting tactics.

After the election, Morrison appointed Watts as the first state Department of Revenue Secretary. He resigned in 1923 after police caught him in the company of an African-American prostitute.

Watts returned to his hometown of Statesville, where he died four years later. Most of the state's Democratic Party leadership attended his funeral.

References

Rob Christensen, "What the obituary didn't say", News & Observer, July 13, 2008
Ed Williams blog: "Sex scandal changed N.C. politics", Charlotte News & Observer, April 2008
North Carolina Manual of 1913
The Political Graveyard
 (June 30, 1913)

1867 births
1927 deaths
People from Statesville, North Carolina
Democratic Party members of the North Carolina House of Representatives
Democratic Party North Carolina state senators
American white supremacists
State cabinet secretaries of North Carolina